Falcón is a state in Venezuela

Falcón may also refer to:

Places 
 Falcón Zulia, a historical Venezuelan state (1881–1890), often simply called Falcón State
 Falcón Municipality, Cojedes, Venezuela
 Falcón Municipality, Falcón, Venezuela
 Falcón Reservoir / Falcón Lake, Mexico-Texas border
 Falcon Dam, Mexico-Texas border
 Sierra de Falcón, Venezuela

People 
 Ada Falcón (1905–2002), Argentine tango dancer, singer and film actress
 Angelo Falcón (1951–2018), Puerto Rican political scientist
 Blas María de la Garza Falcón (1712–1767), Spanish settler in North America
 Henri Falcón (born 1961), Venezuelan politician
 Iris Falcón (born 1973), Peruvian volleyball player 
 Ismael Falcón (born 1984), Spanish footballer
 José Falcón (1944–1974), Portuguese bullfighter
 Juan Carlos Falcón (born 1979), Argentine footballer
 Juan Crisóstomo Falcón (1820–1870), President of Venezuela from 1863 to 1868
 Juan Falcón (actor) (born 1965), Cuban-Chilean actor
 Lidia Falcón (born 1935), Spanish writer and feminist
 Miguel Falcón García-Ramos (born 1979), Spanish footballer and manager
 Ramón Lorenzo Falcón (1855–1909), Argentine politician
 Rodolfo Falcón (born 1972), Cuban Olympic swimmer
 Rubén Falcón (born 1977), Spanish footballer

Other uses 
 Falcón (TV series), based on the books by Robert Wilson

See also 
 Falcon (disambiguation)
 Falcon (surname)

nl:Falcon